José Carlos Pereira is a Brazilian Air Force officer. He is a lieutenant brigadier in the Brazilian Air Force and the former president of Infraero.

References

Year of birth missing (living people)
Living people
Brazilian businesspeople